7 Grandmasters (Chinese: 虎豹龍蛇鷹絕拳; pinyin: Hǔ Bào Lóng Shé Yīng) is a 1978 kung fu film directed by Joseph Kuo, starring Lee Yi Min, Jack Long, Alan Chui Chung-San, Mark Long, Corey Yuen and Lee Yi Min. It was filmed in Mandarin, as opposed to Cantonese which is more common due to Hong Kong's enormous output on the genre.

Plot
Sang Kuan Chun is an old kung fu master who is getting ready to retire from martial arts.  But just as he is about to put up the kings signboard and call it quits, he receives a note alleging that he's not the best. Thus begins his journey for one last challenge with each of the Seven Grandmasters to prove his superiority. As Sang Kuan Chun and his three students travel from one challenge to the next, the foursome acquires a fifth—a young man named Siu Ying who wants desperately to train under master Sang Kuan Chun to avenge his father's death. So he tags along, despite the master's insistence that he will not accept any more students. Eventually we learn more about the master's past.

His own teacher, before he died, left him the secret book of The Pai Mei Twelve Strikes. However a masked man soon stole several pages of the book, leaving only nine strikes. So, somewhere out there, is this unknown man, and he has the final three strikes of Pai Mei, which are the most deadly and can beat even the other nine strikes. Sang Kuan Chun soon accepts the seemingly devout Siu Ying and teaches him the nine known strikes of Pai Mei. Siu Ying ends up learning from his “uncle” that Sang Kuan Chun (who was set up) killed his father during a friendly tournament. Siu Ying is taught the final 3 strikes from a mysterious figure and almost kills Sang Kuan Chun until he being a loyal good student couldn't break his teacher's rule of "Never kill anyone if it can be avoided". This all leads up to an exciting climax, where we learn the identity of the masked man who stole the Pai Mei final strikes and the identity of the man who killed Siu Ying's father.

Cast
Li Yi Min as Siu Ying
Alan Chui Chung-San as Ku Yi Fung
Jack Long as Sang Kuan Chun
Mark Long as Sangs elder student
Corey Yuen as Sun Hung
Nancy Yen as Sang's daughter

External links 
 
 

1978 films
Taiwanese martial arts films
Kung fu films
Films directed by Joseph Kuo
Hong Kong martial arts films
1970s Hong Kong films